Jane or Anne Wentworth (known as the Maid of Ipswich) (c. 1503-1572?), was an English visionary. She was a knight's daughter from Ipswich, Suffolk.

References

1503 births
1572 deaths
16th-century English women
People from Ipswich